The BP Structure, also known as Gebel Dalma, is an exposed impact crater in Libya. It is so called because it was identified by a BP (then British Petroleum) geological survey team.

The crater is 2 km in diameter and its age is estimated to be less than 120 million years (Lower Cretaceous or later).

See also
 Silverpit crater

References

External links
Anonymous (nd) Africa (Impact Craters), Earth Impact Database, Planetary and Space Science Centre, University of New Brunswick, New Brunswick, Canada.

Impact craters of Libya
Cretaceous impact craters